Killokennedy is a civil parish in County Clare, Ireland.

Location

It is on the road from Killaloe to Ennis.
In 1837, as applotted under the tithe act, it contained .
Much of this is mountain pasture, and there is some bog.
The parish is about  covering  in total.

History

As of 1841 there were 3811 inhabitants in 596 houses.
The Catholic chapel of Killokennedy was united to the chapel of Kiltenanlea.
Part of Killokennedy was amalgamated with Kilseily to form what is now the parish of Broadford in the Diocese of Killaloe.

Townlands

Townlands are Aharinaghbeg, Ballymoloney, Ballyquin Beg, Ballyquin More, Barbane, Cappanaslish, Cloongaheen East, Cloongaheen West, Cloonyconry Beg, Cloonyconry More, Coolderry, Crean, Formoyle Beg, Formoyle More, Kilbane, Killeagy (Goonan), Killeagy (Ryan), Killeagy (Stritch), Killokennedy, Kilmore, Kyleglass, Leitrim, Muingboy, Shannaknock, Springmount, Tooreen and Woodpark.

References
Citations

Sources

 

Civil parishes of County Clare